Chemicrazy is the fourth album by Irish alternative rockers That Petrol Emotion. The album was released in April 1990. It was produced by Scott Litt.

Four singles were taken from the album: "Abandon", "Hey Venus", "Sensitize" and "Tingle". Chemicrazy peaked at No. 62 on the UK Albums Chart. It was a hit on Billboard'''s College/Alternative Albums chart. The band supported the album with a North American tour.

Critical reception

The Los Angeles Times noted that, "after two albums of all groove and no song, the thrill is back at the incendiary level you'd expect from a band that descended from Northern Ireland's melodic punk boy wonders the Undertones." The Orlando Sentinel wrote that "Tingle" "is a breezy love song that lopes along and is pure pop at its best." The Houston Chronicle'' called the album "a strong, no-nonsense, uncompromising rock 'n' roll record from one of music's bright new bands."

Track listing

Personnel 
That Petrol Emotion
 Steve Mack – vocals, booklet design, arranger
 Raymond O'Gorman – guitar
 Damian O'Neill – guitar
 John Marchini – bass
 Ciaran McLaughlin – drums
with:
 Scott Litt – producer, engineer
 David Russo – programming, production assistant, piano on "Tingle", background vocals on "Sensitize"
 Hahn Rowe – violin on "Abandon", "Head Staggered" and "Sweet Shiver Burn"
 Joan Jones – trumpet on "Tingle"
 Steve Deutsch – bass on "Sweet Shiver Burn" and Help
 Clif Norrell – engineer
 Stephen Marcussen – mastering
 Gary Panter – cover painting
 Charles Peterson – photography

References 

That Petrol Emotion albums
1990 albums
Virgin Records albums
Albums produced by Scott Litt